The Mayor of Addis Ababa  is head of the executive branch of Addis Ababa's municipal government. The mayor's office is located in Addis Ababa City Hall. Adanech Abebe is the first woman mayor and 32nd mayor of Addis Ababa since 28 September 2021.

The incumbent mayor Adanech Abebe was the Attorney General of Ethiopia before being elected as mayor.

The mayoral office was established in 1910.

Background
Adanech Abebe is a member of the Oromo Democratic party. She has been the mayor of Adama city in the Oromiya region of Ethiopia.
Adanech Abebe was the Attorney General of Ethiopia before being elected as mayor.

Deputy mayor
Being accountable to the mayor, the responsibilities of the deputy mayor include acting on behalf of the mayor in the absence or incapability of the latter, and performing other functions as assigned to him/her by the mayor.

List of mayors

Lord mayor (Kantiba)

Italian governors during occupation

Restored lord mayor

Mayors
In 1974, Emperor Haile Selassie was deposed in a coup d'etat, Ethiopia was proclaimed a republic, and all noble and aristocratic titles were abolished.

See also
List of governors of the Regions of Ethiopia

References